MobiCom may refer to:

 Mobi.com, a wireless carrier based in Hawaiʻi
 MobiCom, the International Conference on Mobile Computing and Networking
 Mobicom Corporation, a mobile phone network in Mongolia